Gaocheng may refer to the following locations in China:

 Gaocheng District, a district of Shijiazhuang, Hebei
 Gaocheng Township (高城乡), a township in Xinzhou, Shanxi

Towns
 Gaocheng, Henan (告成), in Dengfeng, Henan
 Gaocheng, Hubei (高城), in Sui County, Hubei
 Gaocheng, Jiangsu (高塍), in Yixing, Jiangsu
 Gaocheng, Jiangxi (高城), in Wanzai County, Jiangxi
 Gaocheng, Shandong (高城), in Gaoqing County, Shandong
 Gaocheng, Sichuan (高城), in Litang County, Sichuan

See also
Gao Cheng (521–549), regent of Eastern Wei